The Senior League World Series Europe-Africa Region is one of six International regions that currently sends teams to the World Series in Easley, South Carolina. The region's participation in the SLWS dates back to 1969.

Europe–Africa Region Countries

Region Champions
As of the 2022 Senior League World Series.

Results by Country
As of the 2022 Senior League World Series.

See also
Europe–Africa Region in other Little League divisions
Little League
Intermediate League
Junior League
Big League

References

Senior League World Series
Europe-Africa